Niccolò Giannetti (born 12 May 1991) is an Italian professional footballer who plays as a striker for  club Carrarese.

Club career
Giannetti signed on loan for Juventus from Siena for the 2010–11 season. He made his professional debut for Juventus in the UEFA Europa League, in a match against Austrian team Red Bull Salzburg on 4 November 2010. Giannetti scored his first goal for Juventus on 16 December 2010 in a UEFA Europa League match against English team Manchester City. He made his Serie A debut one month later, on 16 January 2011, as a starter in a home league game against Bari. After returning to Siena he was subsequently re-loaned out to newly promoted Serie B side Gubbio. In January 2012 he left for South Tyrol.

On 31 August 2012, he was signed by Serie B club Cittadella.

In the 2013–14 Serie B season, he became a main striker in the first team of Siena, scoring 7 league goals. On 23 January 2014, he signed a new one-year contract with Siena. However, on 31 January 2014, Giannetti was signed by fellow Serie B team Spezia in a co-ownership deal with Siena. In June 2014 Spezia signed him outright.

On 26 July 2018, Giannetti signed to Livorno a loan until 30 June 2019.

On 17 July 2019, Giannetti signed to Salernitana a 3-years contract. On 1 February 2021, he was loaned to Pescara.

On 5 November 2021, he signed with Carrarese on a one-year deal with an option to extend for the second year.

International career
On 8 February 2011, Giannetti made his debut with the Italy U-21 in a friendly match against England played in Empoli.

Career statistics

References

1991 births
Living people
Sportspeople from Siena
Italian footballers
Association football forwards
Serie A players
Serie B players
Serie C players
A.C.N. Siena 1904 players
Juventus F.C. players
A.S. Gubbio 1910 players
F.C. Südtirol players
A.S. Cittadella players
Spezia Calcio players
Cagliari Calcio players
U.S. Livorno 1915 players
U.S. Salernitana 1919 players
Delfino Pescara 1936 players
Carrarese Calcio players
Italy youth international footballers
Italy under-21 international footballers
Footballers from Tuscany